Requejo is a surname. Notable people with the surname include:

 Jesús Requejo San Román (1880-1936), Spanish politician
 Jesús Tartilán Requejo (born 1940), Spanish footballer and coach
 Severino Requejo (born 1941), Spanish sport shooter
 Leuris Pupo Requejo (born 1977), Cuban shooter
 John Requejo (born 1996), American soccer player